is a railway station operated by the Keisei Electric Railway located in Hanamigawa-ku, Chiba Japan. It is 4.0 kilometers from the terminus of the Keisei Chiba Line at Keisei-Tsudanuma Station.

History
Keisei Makuhari Station was opened on 17 July 1921.

Station numbering was introduced to all Keisei Line stations on 17 July 2010; Keisei Makuhari Station was assigned station number KS53.

Lines
Keisei Electric Railway
Keisei Chiba Line

Layout
Keisei Makuhari Station has a single island platform connected by a level crossing to the station building.

Platforms

Surrounding area
 Makuhari Station ( Chūō-Sōbu Line)

Connecting bus services
Keisei Bus operates local bus services from Keisei Makuhari Station.

External links
 Keisei station layout

References

Railway stations in Japan opened in 1921
Railway stations in Chiba Prefecture